Taxation in Serbia consists of the following; the standard corporate tax rate in Serbia is 15%, although some deductions might apply. The standard VAT rate is 20% and the lower rate is 10%. Income from dividends is a subject to a 15% tax. Serbia has tax treaties with most countries in, but few outside, Europe.

The standard personal tax rate is 10%. If the individual earns more than 3 times average salary, an additional tax rate of 10% is applied. For a person earning six times the average salary, an additional 15% is applied on top of the previously described taxes. It must be clear that all the tax rates described are cumulatively applied, one on top of the other.

Obligatory contributions for state funds by an employee (up to a certain amount) include:
 14% state pension fund
 5.15% state health fund
 0.75% unemployment insurance

Obligatory contributions for state funds by an employer (also capped) include:
 12% state pension fund
 5.15% state health fund
 0.00% unemployment insurance

The effective personal income tax rate is therefore somewhere in the range 20–41%. Capital gains are not subject to personal income tax.

References

Law of Serbia
Economy of Serbia
Serbia